Andrzej Grabarczyk (12 January 1964 – 17 July 2016) was a Polish triple jumper. He represented his country at two Olympic Games, in 1988 and 1992, without qualifying for the final. In addition, he reached the final of one outdoor and two indoor World Championships.

His personal bests in the event were 17.00 metres outdoors (0.0 m/s, Kielce 1991) and 16.60 metres indoors (The Hague 1989).

International competitions

References

External links

1964 births
2016 deaths
Polish male triple jumpers
Athletes (track and field) at the 1988 Summer Olympics
Athletes (track and field) at the 1992 Summer Olympics
Olympic athletes of Poland
People from Poddębice County
Sportspeople from Łódź Voivodeship